The long-toed skink (Oligosoma longipes) is a species of skink of the family Scincidae, endemic to New Zealand.  It was first described by Geoff Patterson in 1997. It is only known from a few sites in the South Island of New Zealand and little is known of its habits. It seems to prefer dry, rocky habitats, usually eroding stream terraces or scree slopes. It is diurnal and heliothermic. Maximum snout-vent length is about 70 mm.

Conservation status
As of 2012 the Department of Conservation (DOC) classified the long-toed skink as Nationally Vulnerable under the New Zealand Threat Classification System.

References

Oligosoma
Reptiles of New Zealand
Reptiles described in 1997
Taxa named by Geoff B. Patterson